The 1936–37 1re série season was the 21st season of the 1re série, the top level of ice hockey in France. The final was not contested and no champion was declared.

Paris Championship

Final
 Français Volants - Chamonix Hockey Club (not played)

External links
Season on hockeyarchives.info

Fra
1936–37 in French ice hockey
Ligue Magnus seasons